Francesco Cinquemani is an Italian screenwriter, director, and journalist.

Career
He became author, screenwriter and director after a long career as a journalist and director of magazines.

His debut in a fiction feature film is Andron, featuring Alec Baldwin, Gale Harold, and Danny Glover.,

His second film is Beyond the Edge starring Miloš Biković, Antonio Banderas, and Lyubov Aksyonova.

The Poison Rose, starring John Travolta, Morgan Freeman, Famke Janssen, Peter Stormare, Robert Patrick, and Brendan Fraser was released  by Lionsgate Premiere.

Francesco Cinquemani has received the best directing international award at the Terre di Siena Film Festival.

He lives between Rome and Los Angeles.

Filmography
 Offstage (2014)
Andron (2015) with Alec Baldwin and Danny Glover.
Beyond the Edge (2018) with Antonio Banderas.
The Poison Rose (2019) with John Travolta, Brendan Fraser, Famke Janssen, Peter Stormare, Robert Patrick and Morgan Freeman.
 Lockdown Generation (2021)
 Christmas Thieves (Ladri di Natale), (2021) with Michael Madsen and Tom Arnold.
Muti (2022) with Morgan Freeman.
 Vote for Santa (2022) with Lance Henriksen and  Natasha Henstridge.
 The Christmas Witch, (2022) with  Tom Arnold and William Baldwin.
 The Ghosts of Monday (2022) with Julian Sands.
 Sherlock Santa (2022) with  Tom Arnold and William Baldwin.
 A Day with Santa (2022) with  Tom Arnold and William Baldwin.
 Kid Santa (2023) with Alec Baldwin and William Baldwin.
 Billie's Magic World (2023) with Alec Baldwin and William Baldwin.

References

External links

Italian film directors
Film people from Rome
Living people
Year of birth missing (living people)